Berkeley in the Sixties is a 1990 documentary film by Mark Kitchell.

Summary
The film highlights the origins of the Free Speech Movement beginning with the May 1960 House Un-American Activities Committee hearings at San Francisco City Hall, the development of the counterculture of the 1960s in Berkeley, California, and ending with People's Park in 1969.  The film features 15 student activists and archival footage of Mario Savio, Todd Gitlin, Joan Baez, the Rev. Dr. Martin Luther King Jr., Huey Newton, Allen Ginsberg, Gov. Ronald Reagan and the Grateful Dead.  The film is dedicated to Fred Cody, founder of Cody's Books. It was nominated for an Academy Award for Best Documentary Feature. It also aired on the PBS series POV.

Critical response
Rotten Tomatoes  assigned the film an approval rating of 100%, based on 7 reviews, with an average rating of 8.10/10. Owen Gleiberman from Entertainment Weekly gave it a grade of "A−", writing "The film doesn’t shrink from saying that many of the ’60s social-protest movements went too far. It demonstrates that by the end of the decade, protest had become a narcotic in itself. But only a movie that understands the ’60s as profoundly as this one has truly earned the right to say that."

Awards
Wins
 1990 Sundance Film Festival, Audience Award, 1990 
 National Society of Film Critics Awards 1990, Best Documentary, 1991.
 
Nominations
 63rd Academy Awards, Academy Award for Best Documentary Feature, 1990.
 1990 Sundance Film Festival, Grand Jury Prize, 1990.

See also
1990 in film
Baby Boomers
Generation Gap

References

Further reading

External links 
 Official site and transcript
 Berkeley in the Sixties at POV
 
 
 Excerpt

1990 films
Documentary films about American politics
American documentary films
Hippie films
History of Berkeley, California
1990 documentary films
Documentary films about San Francisco
Political history of the San Francisco Bay Area
Films about activists
Films set in the 1960s
1990s English-language films
1990s American films